The bay-ringed tyrannulet (Phylloscartes sylviolus) is a species of bird in the family Tyrannidae. It is found in the southern Atlantic Forest.

Its natural habitat is subtropical or tropical moist lowland forest. It is becoming rare due to habitat loss.

References

bay-ringed tyrannulet
Birds of the Atlantic Forest
bay-ringed tyrannulet
Taxonomy articles created by Polbot